Abdul Samad Siddiqui (died 21 November 2022) was an Indian educationist and politician who was a Member of Parliament (Rajya Sabha) from Hyderabad - Karnataka region from 1988 till 1994. He was also one of the famous Muslim leaders from the North Karnataka region, known for his obsession with building educational institutes for the poor.

Samad Siddiqui established numerous educational institutions like New Education Society, Millat Education Society etc. across Raichur city in the last 35 years of his life as an educationist and politician.

Samad Siddiqui proposed KMDC(Karnataka Minority Loans) in Karnataka for the minorities to access the grants from the government and Deve Gowda had announced this in Ali bagh Glass house when he was janta party chief.He proposed Salaries for Wakf Employees 

When Mumbai roits took place he locked horns with PRIME MINISTER Narasimha rao and demanded him to step down from the post.

He has made more than 34 institutes like maternity hospital in Raichur for the people of Raichur.

Life and career
Abdul Samad Siddiqui started his political journey with Janata Party which later merged to form Janata Dal. He served as the National General Secretary of the Janata Dal.

After the split in the Janata Dal he co-founded the Lok Shakti which once was a state party in Karnataka, with Ramakrishna Hegde (Former Union Commerce Minister and Karnataka Chief minister) and many Janata Dal leaders. Samad Siddiqui served as the national vice-president of Lok Shakti from its inception.

Siddiqui joined Bahujan Samaj Party in Feb. 2013 during a rally in Bangalore. He was recently one of the educationists at the forefront of agitation to support establishment of Indian Institute of Technology at Raichur.

Siddiqui died following a prolonged illness on 21 November 2022.

References

20th-century births
Year of birth missing
2022 deaths
Indian Muslims
20th-century Indian educational theorists
Rajya Sabha members from Karnataka
People from Raichur
Bahujan Samaj Party politicians
Janata Party politicians
Janata Dal politicians
Lok Shakti politicians